K. Rajesh Hebbar (born 18 November 1967) is an Indian actor who predominantly works in Malayalam film and television industry. He was also the lead vocalist of a rock band named Primitive Knights.

Biography
Hebbar was born in an Udupi Brahmin family settled in Palakkad in 1967. He is married to Anitha and has three children Akash, Varsha and Raksha. He has a sister, Monisha, living in the United States with her husband and two children. He completed his studies from Victoria College, Palakkad.

He began his career shooting a short film Mirage. Hebbar is also a freelance writer with a number of short stories and poems to his credit. He acts in Malayalam films and serials. Rajesh has won the Kerala state critics award for second best actor in television in 2007, the Asiavision Award for Best Supporting Actor in 2011, the Kerala State Television Award for second best actor for his work in the telefilm Tik Tik and the Asianet award for best actor in a negative role in 2012 for his role in the serial Ammakili. He is well known for his roles in serials like Orma, Ammakili, Unniyarcha and Sundari. His notable roles in movies include Innathe Chintha Vishayam and Manassinakkare.

Television
Serials (Partial)

Programs

Films
Films (Partial)

Short films
Grace Villa
Deva ju
Pennoruthi
Mirage

External links

1967 births
Living people
Male actors in Malayalam cinema
Indian male film actors
Male actors in Malayalam television
Indian male television actors
21st-century Indian male actors
Male actors from Palakkad